Virginio Ferrari (born 19 October 1952) is an Italian former professional Grand Prix motorcycle road racer. His best season was in the 1979 500cc world championship, when he finished second to Kenny Roberts.

Motorcycle racing career
Ferrari teamed up with Benjamin Grau to win the 1975 1000 km du Mugello endurance race riding a Ducati. He began the 1979 season with a string of podium results, finishing second to Barry Sheene at the Venezuelan Grand Prix and, second to Kenny Roberts in the Austrian Grand Prix. He continued to post good results with a third place in Germany and another second place behind Roberts in Italy. Ferrari dropped from the podium with a fourth place in Spain before bouncing back with another second place to Roberts in Yugoslavia. His victory at the Dutch TT in Assen together with an eighth-place finish by Roberts, vaulted Ferrari into the championship lead as the series headed towards Belgium.

Ferrari became embroiled in a controversy at the Belgian Grand Prix held at the Spa circuit when he, along with Roberts and other top riders refused to race due to unsafe track conditions. The circuit had been paved just days before the race creating a track that many of the racers felt was unsafe due to diesel seeping to the surface. Ferrari along with Roberts, instigated a riders' revolt and refused to race. The F.I.M. responded by suspending Roberts and Ferrari. The F.I.M. later reduced this to a probation.

After the Belgian round, Ferrari suffered a series of disastrous results with a fifteenth place in Finland followed by an improved fourth place in Britain before a crash at the season-ending French Grand Prix handed the world championship to Roberts.

In 1986 Ferrari rode a Honda NSR250 in a team run by Takazumi Katayama in the World Championship without much success, with just four top 10 results, his best, a 6th place in Silverstone. He finished 14th in the Championship. Ferrari won the 1987 TT Formula 1 title aboard a Bimota YB4 EI. His last Grand Prix season was in 1989, again in the 250 class, with the Italian made Gazzaniga, failing to score any points and finishing 28th in the Salzburgring and 27th in his last Grand Prix in Brno.

He took over as the team manager until 1998, when Davide Tardozzi took the job. Ferrari briefly managed the Kawasaki PSG-1 team in the World Superbike Championship in 2007.

Motorcycle Grand Prix results
Points system from 1969 to 1987:

Points system from 1988 to 1992:

(key) (Races in bold indicate pole position; races in italics indicate fastest lap)

References
Official Website

1952 births
Living people
Italian motorcycle racers
500cc World Championship riders
250cc World Championship riders
Superbike World Championship riders